Although the North Atlantic Treaty Organization (NATO) was present throughout the Cold War as the opposite to the Warsaw Pact, and conducted joint military exercises, no military operations took place. All military NATO operations have occurred after the Cold War when NATO's influence in a post-Cold War rose to prominence in Bosnia where NATO gradually stepped up its efforts to end the trouble. This culminated with NATO's first air campaign in 1995, Operation Deliberate Force, which targeted the Army of Republika Srpska whose presence in Bosnia posed a danger to United Nations Safe Areas and ultimately the bombing helped to bring about the Dayton Accords.

The organization played a prominent role in Afghanistan after the September 11 attacks, as the United States invoked Article 5 of the North Atlantic Treaty which deemed the attacks to be an external attack on all NATO members under the idea of collective defense. Aside from efforts in Afghanistan, NATO has participated in a wide range of roles including relief effort, counter-piracy, enforcing no-fly zones and naval blockades.

Bosnia and Herzegovina (1992–2004)
NATO was prominent in Bosnia during the early 1990s, and gradually its role became larger with some operations escalating, for instance Operation Sky Monitor turned into Operation Deny Flight which gave NATO "all measures necessary" to enforce a more stringent no-fly zone unlike Sky Monitor during which the no-fly zone was violated over 500 times. It took 46 years after NATO's inception in 1949 for the organization first ever military intervention took place in 1995, Operation Deliberate Force which was targeted the Army of Republika Srpska in Bosnia whose presence posed a danger to designated United Nations "safe areas". The air campaign helped bring about the Dayton Accords.

Serbia and Kosovo (1999–present)

2001–present

See also

 List of NATO exercises
 Military and civilian missions of the European Union
 Missions of the Western European Union
 Exercises of the Western Union

References

 
Lists of military operations